The following is a list of mayors of the city of São Luís, in Maranhão state, Brazil.

 Joaquim Sousândrade, 1890-1891	
 , 1891-1892, 1897-1901, 1906-1909 
 José Rodrigues Fernandes, 1892-1897 	
 Nuno Álvares de Pinho, 1901-1905 
 Afonso Henrique de Pinho, 1905-1906
 , 1909-1910	
 , 1910-1912
 , 1912-1916	
 Afonso Giffening de Matos, 1916	
 , 1916-1919
 José Luso Torres, 1919-1922
 Raimundo Gonçalves da Silva, 1922	
 , 1922-1927	
 , 1927	
 Jayme Tavares, 1927-1930 
 Basílio Torreão Franco de Sá, 1930	
 , 1930	
 Antonio Carlos Teixeira Leite, 1930-1931	
 Carlos dos Reis Macieira, 1931 	
 João Manuel Gomes Tinoco, 1931	
 Raimundo Frazão Cantanhede, 1931	
 João Inácio Martins, 1931	
 Demerval Rosa, 1931-1933
 Alcides Jansen Serra Lima Pereira, 1933
 Pedro José de Oliveira, 1933-1934
 , 1934-1935
 Manoel Vieira de Azevedo, 1935-1936
 , 1936-1937
 Clodoaldo Cardoso, 1937
 , 1937-1945 	
 Renato Archer, 1945-1948
 Antonio Euzébio da Costa Rodrigues, 1948-1951
 Edson Brandão, 1951
 , 1951-1953
 Eduardo Viana Pereira, 1953-1954
 Orfila Cardoso Nunes, 1954-1955
 , 1955-1956, 1959-1962, 1978 
 Emiliano dos Reis Macieira, 1956-1959
 Ruy Ribeiro Mesquita, 1962-1963
 Djard Ramos Martins, 1963-1966
 Epitácio Cafeteira, 1966-1969	
 Vicente Fialho, 1969-1970
 José Ateniense Libério, 1970-1971
 Haroldo Tavares, 1971-1975 
 , 1975-1978
 , 1978-1979
 Lereno Nunes, 1979	
 , 1979-1980, 1983-1985
 , 1980-1983 
 Gardênia Gonçalves, 1986-1988 
 Jackson Lago, 1989-1992, 1997-2002
 Conceição Andrade, 1993-1996 
 , 2002-2008 
 João Castelo, 2009-2012
 Edivaldo Holanda Jr, 2013-

See also
  (city council)
 
 List of mayors of largest cities in Brazil (in Portuguese)
 List of mayors of capitals of Brazil (in Portuguese)

References

This article incorporates information from the Portuguese Wikipedia.

São Luís